Martha Redbone (born 1966) is an American blues and soul singer, who has won awards for her contemporary music. Her music is a mix of rhythm and blues and soul music influences, fused with elements of Native American music. She identifies as having Choctaw, Eastern Cherokee, and African-American ancestry.

Early life and education
Martha Redbone was born in 1966, in New York City. Martha spent time with her maternal grandparents in Harlan County. She wrote that she spent much of her childhood in Black Mountain, Kentucky, with her maternal grandmother, whom she identifies as being of Eastern Cherokee and Shawnee ancestry, and her maternal grandfather, whom she identifies as being of Black and Choctaw ancestry. She wrote that she moved back to Brooklyn, New York, as a child, "but we went back to Kentucky often for ceremonies."

Career
Redbone became a musician and singer, combining music styles with Black American and Native American roots music. She began performing under the name Martha Redbone in 1996, using the nickname "Redbone" given to her by her father. She was mentored by Junie Morrison of the Ohio Players and Parliament Funkadelic where she honed her skills as a professional songwriter and producer. Since bursting onto the scene at the 2002 Native American Music Awards, she has earned a reputation as a collaborator, performer, educator, and mentor across native North America and in some cases abroad. In early 2007, Redbone's Skintalk won The 6th Annual Independent Music Awards for Best R&B Album.

Her 2012 work, The Garden of Love – Songs of William Blake, sets Blake's poetry to music that draws from rural influences of Appalachia: English folk, African American, and Native American traditions. She tours nationally with The Martha Redbone Roots Project. The New York Times said her voice holds “both the taut determination of mountain music and the bite of American Indian singing.”

Discography
Home of the Brave (2001)
Skintalk (2004)
Future Street  (2006)
 The Garden of Love – Songs of William Blake (2012)

References

External links
Martha Redbone's website

African-American women songwriters
American soul musicians
American people of Cherokee descent
American people of Choctaw descent
American people of Shawnee descent
Living people
American singers
American songwriters
Musicians from Brooklyn
1966 births
Independent Music Awards winners
Songwriters from New York (state)
21st-century American women
Singers from Kentucky
Songwriters from Kentucky
21st-century African-American women singers